Amaran is a 1992 Indian Tamil-language action gangster film written, directed, and produced by K. Rajeshwar. The film stars Karthik and Bhanupriya, with Radha Ravi, Prathap K. Pothan, and Shammi Kapoor in supporting roles. The film had music by Adithyan and cinematography by P. C. Sreeram. The film released on 15 January 1992. Actor Karthik became a playback singer for the first time in this film. The film became a box office hit.

Plot
An orphaned child (Karthik) helps Govindan (Vijayakumar) escape from a bunch of gangsters. The child is named Amaran by the grateful Govindan and is brought up by him. After Govindan's demise, his wife (Manjula Vijayakumar) raises Amaran, who grows up to become a kind-hearted slum lord. One day, Amaran encounters a strange man, Raja Varma (Prathap K. Pothan), who repeatedly persuades him to take on a heartless don named Aandava Perumal (Radha Ravi), who has a violent and brutal past. Amaran keeps ignoring Raja Varma, but after Raja Varma is murdered by Perumal's goons, he learns that Aandava Perumal had also destroyed his own family when he was a child.  Amaran gives refuge to Raja Varma's daughter Sivagaami (Bhanupriya), and they fall in love with each other. Amaran soon starts sparring with Aandava Perumal, with deadly consequences to Amaran's adopted family. Sivagaami and a grievously injured Amaran escape to Goa, where they are taken care of by an underworld don named Miranda (Shammi Kapoor). Amaran continues to work for him for a while and marries Sivagaami. After a few years, he returns to Tamil Nadu to take on his sworn enemy, and a bloody conflict ensues. During this conflict, Amaran's son gets killed, and the film ends with Amaran killing Aandava Perumal while saying, "This wouldn't have happened if you had not killed my son".

Cast

Karthik as Amaran
Bhanupriya as Sivagaami
Radha Ravi as Aandava Perumal
Prathap K. Pothan as Raja Varma
Shammi Kapoor as Don Miranda
Vijayakumar as "Sepoy" Govindan, Amaran's foster father
Manjula Vijayakumar as Amaran's foster mother
Livingston (credited as Ranjan) as Inspector Duraipandi, Amaran's father
Uday Prakash as Chinna Perumal
Silk Smitha as Manga
Disco Shanti as Shanti
M. R. Krishnamurthy
Latha
Ra. Sankaran as Jinnah's father
Piraisoodan as Astrologer
Vikas Rishi as Jinnah
Pereira as Shooter
Mahima
K. Rajpreeth
Chitti
Master Vasanth
Baby Anitha
Rajendran as Henchman (uncredited)

Production
Amaran marked Shammi Kapoor's Tamil debut.

Soundtrack
The music was composed by Adithyan.

Tamil version 

The soundtrack, released in 1992, features 8 tracks with lyrics written by Piraisoodan and Vairamuthu. Vethala Potta Shokkula, Vasanthame Arugil Va, Chandhirane Sooriyane, and Tring Tring were all written by Piraisoodan

Telugu version 

This film was dubbed into Telugu as Amar. Lyrics were written by Rajasri.

Release
It was later dubbed in Telugu as Amar.

References

1992 films
1990s Tamil-language films
1992 crime drama films
1990s crime action films
1990s action drama films
Indian action drama films
Indian crime drama films
Indian crime action films
Films directed by K. Rajeshwar